The 2002–03 Essex Senior Football League season was the 32nd in the history of Essex Senior Football League a football competition in England.

League table

The league featured 15 clubs which competed in the league last season, along with two new clubs:
Romford, resigned from the Isthmian League
Waltham Abbey, joined from the Essex & Herts Border Combination

League table

References

Essex Senior Football League seasons
2002–03 in English football leagues